Roxita apicella is a moth in the family Crambidae. It was described by David E. Gaskin in 1984. It is found in Malaysia.

References

Crambinae
Moths described in 1984